The 1997 UCI Cyclo-cross World Championships were held in Munich, Germany from 1-2 February 1997.

Medal table

Medal summary

Results

Elite

Under-23

Junior

References

UCI Cyclo-cross World Championships
Cyclo-cross
International cycle races hosted by Germany
UCI Cyclo-cross World Championships